Ivan Tsonov (born 31 July 1966) is a Bulgarian former wrestler who competed in the 1988 Summer Olympics and in the 2000 Summer Olympics.

References

1966 births
Living people
Olympic wrestlers of Bulgaria
Wrestlers at the 1988 Summer Olympics
Wrestlers at the 2000 Summer Olympics
Bulgarian male sport wrestlers
Olympic silver medalists for Bulgaria
Olympic medalists in wrestling
Medalists at the 1988 Summer Olympics
20th-century Bulgarian people
21st-century Bulgarian people